Accounts of Chemical Research is a semi-monthly peer-reviewed scientific journal published by the American Chemical Society containing overviews of basic research and applications in chemistry and biochemistry. It was established in 1968 and the editor-in-chief is Cynthia J. Burrows (University of Utah).

Abstracting and indexing 
The journal is abstracted and indexed in:

According to the Journal Citation Reports, the journal has a 2020 impact factor of 22.384.

References

External links 
 

Chemical Research
Publications established in 1968
Monthly journals
English-language journals